The Puketapapa Women's Suffrage Memorial is located in Rose Park in the suburb of Three Kings, Auckland, New Zealand. It commemorates the local women who campaigned for women's suffrage.

The memorial was commissioned by the Puketapapa Local Board and Auckland Council, designed by artists Matthew van Sturmer and Carmen Sosich and constructed by MvS Studio. The design is an abstract depiction of the camellia, which was a symbol of the suffrage movement in New Zealand in the nineteenth century. The base of the flower is inscribed with the names of the local women who signed the 1893 petition to Parliament requesting the vote for women.

It was unveiled on 19 September 2013, the 120th anniversary of women gaining the vote in New Zealand.

See also
Kate Sheppard National Memorial
List of monuments and memorials to women's suffrage

References

Monuments and memorials in New Zealand
Monuments and memorials to women's suffrage
Women's suffrage in New Zealand
Buildings and structures in Auckland